The  is a river in Japan which empties into the Ibi River in Gifu Prefecture. It which ultimately flows into the Kiso River.

River communities 
The river passes through or forms the boundary of Ōgaki, Yōrō, and Wanouchi.

References 

Rivers of Gifu Prefecture
Rivers of Japan